is a railway station in Aoba-ku, Sendai, Miyagi Prefecture, Japan, operated by East Japan Railway Company (JR East).

Lines

Station layout
The station has a one side platform, serving a single bi-directional track. The station is unattended.

History
Kumagane Station opened on 30 August 1931. A new station building was completed in August 1983. The station was absorbed into the JR East network upon the privatization of JNR on 1 April 1987.

Surrounding area
Kumagane Post Office

External links

 

Stations of East Japan Railway Company
Railway stations in Sendai
Senzan Line
Railway stations in Japan opened in 1931